The Brandenburger is a warmblood horse breed originating in Germany.

Characteristics
The Brandenburger is a well-balanced horse with a lively temperament, an easy to get along with character, and is known for being energetic with little tendency to nervousness.

The typical height is 16.1 hands.  They have medium size heads, well-set necks with long and straight backs.  They are very muscled with strong legs. The most common color is bay, and they usually have dark markings on the ankles and legs; sometimes with a white marking on the forehead. Their coat is shiny with thick skin.

History
Horse breeding was first mentioned in documents in the Brandenburg March in the 15th century although at that point, there was not a uniform or standardized breed.

The development of the modern Brandenburger sport horse during the mid-20th century was achieved by utilizing Trakehners, Hanoveranians and English Thoroughbreds. The national and state stud of Neustadt/Dosse, which was founded by King Frederick Wilhelm II in 1788, had substantial influence on the development of the Brandenburger.

Bloodlines, breeding, and prominent sires

Following reunification with the former German Democratic Republic (East Germany), stallions from Hanoverian bloodlines and lines which came via Redefin gained a big influence on the Brandenburg breed. These included inter alia the:

 Detektiv line (via Duell by Duellant, Dollarprinz by Dollart, Dispondeus by Direx),
 Goldschaum xx line (via Gottland by Goldstein),
 Adept line (via Abendwind by Adept, Akzento by Arzano).

The stallion Komet who came from Mecklenburg, and who miraculously escaped the enforced castration that was the rule for unapproved stallions in East Germany at that time, later became a great sire and produced a series of successful showjumping sires such as Kolibri by Kobold and Kogani I by Kobold I.

A comprehensive blood rejuvenation has taken place since 1990, through the newly founded breeders' association. Since then, mainly Holsteiners from the Ladykiller xx line and the Cor-de-la-Bryère-SF lines, but also stallions from Oldenburg have gained predominance.

In 1999, the breeding stock encompassed 1,927 registered broodmares and 76 sires. The Neustadt/Dosse state stud is the breeding centre. This is where the stallion approval takes place in October every year.

Uses
Brandenburgers are to be found in all spheres of riding and driving sports as well as in pleasure riding. Poetin, a Brandenburger mare, was a successful dressage horse and sold for a record amount at auction: 2.5 million Euros.

References

 Brandenburg Horse - Brandenburger,. (2013). Retrieved March 11, 2016, from http://www.mypets.net.au/brandenburg-horse-brandenburger/
 Brandenburger. (n.d.). Retrieved March 11, 2016, from http://horses.petbreeds.com/l/111/Brandenburger
Brandenburger Horse

Horse breeds
Horse breeds originating in Germany
Warmbloods